Tetragrammaton Records was an American record label founded in 1968 by music industry executives Roy Silver, Bruce Post Campbell, Marvin Deane, and comedian Bill Cosby. Silver, at the time, was also Cosby's manager. The term "Tetragrammaton" refers to the Hebrew name of God considered by some to be unspeakable (YHWH, or "Yahweh", translated as "Jehovah" in English).  The label's most successful act was rock band Deep Purple.

History
Tetragrammaton was also responsible for releasing the controversial 1968 Apple Records album, Unfinished Music No. 1: Two Virgins in the United States. This avant-garde album was recorded by John Lennon and Yoko Ono and featured nude photos of the pair on the front and back cover. Tetragrammaton stepped in as distributor after Capitol Records, the usual US distributor for Apple and the Beatles, refused the album, citing a possible negative response from retailers.

The Lennon/Ono album was also declared to be pornography by some authorities. Tetragrammaton went into financial difficulties, which may have been related to the distribution of the Lennon/Ono album. Approximately 30,000 copies of the record were seized by police at a warehouse in New Jersey. The records were held as evidence in a court case, which made it impossible for the label to sell them at the time.

Bill Cosby's 1969 stand-up comedy album, 8:15 12:15, was also released by the label, as were two albums by comedian Murray Roman, You Can't Beat People  Up & Have Them Say I Love You and A Blind Man's Movie.

A number of the label's projects were left unissued. Among these were a second album by singer songwriter Elyse Weinberg, and an album by Memphis musician Captain Milk (real name, Edwin Hubbard) who described himself as a "flute picker". Tetragrammaton did however release a single of the Lennon/McCartney song "Hey Jude" from the Captain Milk recording sessions. An English rock band named Bodast also recorded an unreleased album for Tetragrammaton in 1968. The group featured guitarist Steve Howe, later a member of Yes. The Bodast recordings were first released in 1981 by Cherry Red Records.

Despite having several popular artists on its roster, Tetragrammaton ceased trading after declaring bankruptcy in 1970. In 1972, Deep Purple's new label, Warner Bros. Records (also Cosby's former label), reissued various tracks from the group's first three Tetragrammaton albums on one compilation album entitled Purple Passages. In Canada, some of Tetragrammaton's releases were manufactured and distributed by the Canadian division of Polydor Records, which also issued several Canada-only Deep Purple compilations after Tetragrammaton's demise.

Tetragrammaton's co-founder, Marvin Deane, died of heart failure on August 16, 2010, in Los Angeles, California, at age 79.

Discography
 T-101You Can't Beat People Up and Have Them Say I Love YouMurray Roman [1968]
 T-102Shades of Deep PurpleDeep Purple [7/68] 
 T-103The Thorn in Mrs. Rose's SideBiff Rose [1968]
 T-104IvoryIvory [1968]
 T-105Let Me Show You the WayBobby Paris [1968]  
 T-106Together Again for the First TimeCarol Burnett & Martha Raye [1968]
 T-107The Book of TaliesynDeep Purple [11/68] 
 T-110Both Sides NowJohnstons [1968]
 T-111Relight My FireRhetta Hughes [1969] 
 T-112Sweet ThursdaySweet Thursday [1969]
 T-113Tom GhentTom Ghent [1969] 
 T-114SummerhillSummerhill [1968] 
 T-116Children of LightBiff Rose [1969]
 T-117ElyseElyse Weinberg [6/1/69] 
 T-118DeparturePat Boone [1969] 
 T-119Deep PurpleDeep Purple [6/69] 
 T-120Blind Man's MovieMurray Roman [1969] 
 T-123The Mother of Us AllSteve Baron Quartet [1969]
 T-124Hello Love [aka Gene and Francesca]Gene & Francesca [1969]  
 T-125Joshua FoxJoshua Fox [1969] 
 T-12?Greasepaint SmileElyse Weinberg [unissued] 
 T-131Concerto for Group and OrchestraDeep Purple [1969]
 T-5000The Girl on a Motorcycle (Soundtrack)Douglas Gamley & British Lion Orchestra [1969] 
 Apple/Tetragrammaton T-5001Unfinished Music No. 1: Two VirginsJohn Lennon & Yoko Ono [01/1969] 
 T-5002QuatrainQuatrain [1969] 
 T-5003Mark Slade's New HatMark Slade [1968]  
 T-5006Che! (soundtrack)Lalo Schifrin [1969] 
 T-5007The Chairman (Soundtrack)Jerry Goldsmith [1969] 
 TD-51008:15 12:15Bill Cosby [1969] 
 TD-5101Once Upon a TimeKingston Trio [1969]
 TDL 5200The Great White Hope (Original Cast)Charles Gross & Cast [1969]

See also
 List of record labels

References

External links
Discography from BSN Pubs

Defunct record labels of the United States
Record labels established in 1968
Record labels disestablished in 1969
Rock record labels
Pop record labels
Comedy record labels
Bill Cosby